The 2018 FIBA U16 European Championship was the 32nd edition of the Under-16 European Basketball Championship. The competition took place from 10 to 18 August 2018 in Novi Sad, Serbia. Sixteen (16) teams are participating, including 2017 Division B top three finishers.

The defending champions were France.

Participating teams

 

  (3rd place at 2017 Division B)

  (1st place at 2017 Division B)

  (2nd place at 2017 Division B)

First round
In this round, sixteen teams are allocated in four groups of four teams each. All teams advance to the Playoffs.

Group A

Group B

Group C

Group D

Final round

Bracket

5th–8th place bracket

9th–16th place bracket

13th–16th place bracket

Final standings

Awards

All-Tournament Team

  Héctor Alderete
  Usman Garuba
  Boris Tišma
  Alperen Şengün
  Roko Prkačin

References

External links
FIBA official website

FIBA U16 European Championship
2018–19 in European basketball
2018–19 in Serbian basketball
FIBA Europe Under-16 Championship
International youth basketball competitions hosted by Serbia
Sports competitions in Novi Sad
August 2018 sports events in Europe